Gilbert Vaughan "Bert" Beard (a.k.a. "Blue" Beard; "Bluey" Beard) (5 July 1909 – 8 November 1983) was an Australian rules footballer from Western Australia who played with South Melbourne in the Victorian Football League (VFL) during the 1930s. He also played first-grade cricket for the South Melbourne Cricket Club.

Family
The son of John Beard (1848-1924), and Sarah Beard (1866-1951), née Gibson, Gilbert Vaughan Beard was born at Northam, Western Australia on 5 July 1909.

He married Olive Eva Murphy (1909-1961) on 17 August 1935. Their son, Neville played in the West Australian Football League and won the Sandover Medal in 1961.

Football
He was powerfully built ruckman, and was a fine high mark and a good long kick of the ball.

South Fremantle
Beard was recruited to South Melbourne from the South Fremantle in the West Australian Football League (WANFL).

South Melbourne
He made his VFL debut for South Melbourne in 1932.

He was one of a number of South Melbourne players who were given immediate, long-term, secure, paid employment outside of football within the (137 store) grocery empire of the South Melbourne president, South Melbourne Lord Mayor, and Member of the Victorian Legislative Council, Archie Crofts. The collection of players recruited from interstate in 1932/1933 become known as South Melbourne's "Foreign Legion".

In 1933, he was 19th man in the club's premiership side; he replaced injured half-back flanker Hugh McLaughlin in the second quarter.

Fitzroy
He stayed at South Melbourne until the 1935 season when after one game he decided to cross to Fitzroy to play out the season.

South Fremantle
Accepting the offer of lucrative employment from a West Australian bakery firm, Beard left Melbourne and returned to Perth in March 1936. Once his clearance from Fitzroy had been obtained, He played his first match, in his return season, on 4 July 1936. By early 1937, he had returned to Victoria.

Bairnsdale
In 1938 he was appointed captain-coach of the Bairnsdale Football Club, in the Gippsland Football League, as a replacement for Fred Gilby who has been appointed elsewhere. Despite Beard's efforts ("For Bairnsdale the most outstanding performers were B. Beard (whose marking was superb), …"), Bairnsdale were defeated by the Maffra Football Club, 13.13 (91) to 10.13 (73).

South Melbourne Districts
He was appointed captain-coach of the South Melbourne Districts Football Club (in the Sub-District Football League) in 1939.

Footnotes

References
 Ross, J. (ed), 100 Years of Australian Football 1897–1996: The Complete Story of the AFL, All the Big Stories, All the Great Pictures, All the Champions, Every AFL Season Reported, Viking, (Ringwood), 1996.

External links

 Boyles Football Photos: Bert Beard

1909 births
1983 deaths
Australian rules footballers from Western Australia
Sydney Swans players
Sydney Swans Premiership players
Fitzroy Football Club players
South Fremantle Football Club players
One-time VFL/AFL Premiership players
People from Northam, Western Australia